13N may refer to:
 13N (Argentina), a protest in Argentina
 The November 2015 Paris attacks
 The Trinca Airport in New Jersey
 Nitrogen-13 (13N), an isotope of nitrogen

See also
 N13 (disambiguation)